Jailton dos Santos, known as Dinda (born 18 August 1972) is a former Brazilian football player.

He played 8 seasons and 129 games (scoring 19 goals) in the Primeira Liga for União de Leiria and Marítimo.

Club career
He made his Primeira Liga debut for União de Leiria on 26 March 1995 as a late substitute in a 5–1 victory over Farense.

References

1972 births
Sportspeople from Ceará
Living people
Brazilian footballers
Clube Náutico Capibaribe players
Associação Desportiva Confiança players
Sport Club do Recife players
U.D. Leiria players
Brazilian expatriate footballers
Expatriate footballers in Portugal
Primeira Liga players
F.C. Paços de Ferreira players
Liga Portugal 2 players
Associação Académica de Coimbra – O.A.F. players
C.S. Marítimo players
Guarany Sporting Club players
Murici Futebol Clube players
Belo Jardim Futebol Clube players
Association football midfielders